Ezequiel Montenegro (born 10 April 1942) is a Cuban rower. He competed in the men's eight event at the 1964 Summer Olympics.

References

1942 births
Living people
Cuban male rowers
Olympic rowers of Cuba
Rowers at the 1964 Summer Olympics
Place of birth missing (living people)